Pope Dreams, also known as Music for My Mother, is a 2006 film written and directed by Patrick Hogan. The film won five awards at various film festivals.

Premise
An aspiring drummer wants his dying mother to get an audience with the pope while he also tries to impress a girl out of his league.

Principal cast
 Phillip Vaden as  Andy Venable
 Marnette Patterson  as  Brady Rossman
 Julie Hagerty as  Kristina Venable
 Stephen Tobolowsky  as  Carl Venable
 Noel Fisher  as  Pete
 Samantha Anderson  as  Heather
 Casey Barclay  as  Eric
 Jordan Belfi  as Lucas

Reception
DVDTalk recommended the film and said it "has a welcome honesty and heart to it that, when bolstered by such skillful performances, makes it well worth hunting down.
FilmThreat gave it a positive review.

References

External links
 
 

2006 films
American coming-of-age drama films
2006 drama films
2000s coming-of-age drama films
2000s English-language films
2000s American films